Kelsey-Lee Barber (née Roberts; born 20 September 1991) is an Australian track and field athlete who competes in the javelin throw. She won gold at the 2019 World Championships, and her personal best of 67.70 m ranks her 13th in the overall list.

Barber is based at the Queensland Academy of Sport in Brisbane. She was formerly based at the Australian Institute of Sport in Canberra.

Personal life
Born in East London, South Africa, Barber's family moved to Australia in 2000. It was this relocation that setup the career of Barber.

Barber arrived in Australia during the Sydney Olympics and lived in Corryong in Victoria. Her uncle and aunt owned a dairy farm and she competed in athletics at the school carnival. She was so successful that she progressed in discus competitions through the zone and regional carnivals. She moved from Corryong to Canberra in 2007 and started taking athletics more seriously. She trained with a coach and at age 17 won the javelin at the Pacific School Games in Canberra.

She married her coach Mike Barber after the 2018  Commonwealth Games.

Career
Barber made her international debut at the 2014 Commonwealth Games, finishing third with 62.95 m. She competed at the 2015 World Championships in Beijing without qualifying for the final. A back injury in early 2016 disrupted her preparation for the 2016 Summer Olympics and she finished 28th in qualifying.

Barber had a breakthrough season in 2017. She produced three consecutive personal bests in competitions in Turku, Lausanne and London. At the World Championships, she qualified automatically for the final and finished 10th. She finished the season with a silver medal at the Diamond League Final in Zurich and another personal best of 64.53 m.

In 2018, she placed second at the national titles behind Kathryn Mitchell. Barber threw a new personal best of 64.57 m at the Queensland International Track Classic in Brisbane on 28 March. In the 2018 Commonwealth Games Barber received a silver medal with a 63.89 m throw.

Barber won gold at the 2019 Oceania Athletics Championships with a personal best and championship record 65.61 m throw. At the Spitzen Leichtathletik Luzern in July, she won gold and improved on her personal best, throwing 67.70 m. This also moved Barber to second on the Oceanian list behind Mitchell, and into 12th in the overall list. She won the gold medal at the 2019 World Championships with 66.56 m on the final throw, moving her from 4th to 1st place. She was recognised in the Canberra Sport Awards as Female Athlete of the Year. 

In 2021, following the COVID-19 disruptions to competition, Barber threw 61.09 m to place second at the national titles.

Barber won bronze in the final at the 2020 Summer Olympics in Tokyo, throwing 64.56m.

At the 2022 World Athletics Championships, Barber won a gold medal in javelin, making her the first woman to ever retain the women's World Championships javelin title.Later that year, she also won a gold medal at the 2022 Commonwealth Games with a throw of 64.43m.

Competition record

Seasonal bests by year

References

External links

Australian female javelin throwers
Living people
Sportspeople from East London, Eastern Cape
1991 births
World Athletics Championships athletes for Australia
Athletes (track and field) at the 2014 Commonwealth Games
Athletes (track and field) at the 2018 Commonwealth Games
Athletes (track and field) at the 2016 Summer Olympics
Athletes (track and field) at the 2020 Summer Olympics
Olympic athletes of Australia
Olympic female javelin throwers
Commonwealth Games medallists in athletics
Commonwealth Games bronze medallists for Australia
South African emigrants to Australia
World Athletics Championships medalists
World Athletics Championships winners
Australian Athletics Championships winners
Medalists at the 2020 Summer Olympics
Olympic bronze medalists in athletics (track and field)
Olympic bronze medalists for Australia
People educated at Lake Ginninderra College
Medallists at the 2018 Commonwealth Games